Seven Years of Highly Defective People, is a 1997 book by Dilbert cartoonist Scott Adams which explains the origins and evolution of many of the Dilbert characters, and Adams includes comments under each comic strip reprinted in the book. In his introduction, Adams says, "Some of the notes are fascinating insights into the world of cartooning. Other notes are interesting only for their poor grammar and spelling, thus proving that you can be a moron and still have a successful career as a cartoonist." The book went to number three on The New York Times Business Best Sellers List for paperbacks.

The title is a play on the book The 7 Habits of Highly Effective People.

Further reading
 Seven Years of Highly Defective People by Scott Adams, Andrews McMeel Publishing (1997) .
 New York Times Business Best Sellers

1997 non-fiction books
Dilbert books